Fritz Fischer (5 March 1908 – 1 December 1999) was a German historian best known for his analysis of the causes of World War I. In the early 1960s Fischer advanced the controversial thesis at the time that responsibility for the outbreak of the war rested solely on Imperial Germany. Fischer's anti-revisionist claims shocked the West German government and histor­ical establishment, as it made Germany guilty for both world wars, challenging the national belief in Germany's innocence and converting its recent history into one of conquest and aggression. 
 
Fritz Fischer was named in The Encyclopedia of Historians and Historical Writing as the most important German historian of the 20th century.

Biography 
Fischer was born in Ludwigsstadt in Bavaria. His father was a railway inspector. Educated at grammar schools in Ansbach and Eichstätt, Fischer attended the University of Berlin and the University of Erlangen, where he studied history, pedagogy, philosophy and theology. Fischer joined the Nazi Party in 1939, and left the Party in 1942. Fischer's major early influences were the standard Hegelian-Rankean opposition typical of the pre-1945 German historical profession, and as such, Fischer's early writings bore a strong bent towards the right. This influence was reflected in Fischer's first books, biographies of Ludwig Nicolovius, a leading 19th-century Prussian educational reformer and of Moritz August von Bethmann-Hollweg, the Prussian Minister of Education between 1858 and 1862.

In 1942, Fischer was given a professorship at the University of Hamburg and he married Margarete Lauth-Volkmann, with whom he fathered two children. Fischer served in the Wehrmacht in World War II. After his release from a POW camp in 1947, Fischer went on as a professor at the University of Hamburg, where he stayed until his retirement in 1978.

Theorist and author

National Socialism 

In 1949, at the first post-war German Historians' Congress in Munich, Fischer strongly criticized the Lutheran tradition in German life, accusing the Lutheran church of glorifying the state at the expense of individual liberties and thus helping to bring about Nazi Germany. Fischer complained that the Lutheran church had for too long glorified the state as a divinely sanctioned institution that could do no wrong, and thus paved the way for National Socialism. Fischer rejected the then popular argument in Germany that Nazi Germany had been the result of the Treaty of Versailles, and instead argued that the origins of Nazi Germany predated 1914, and were the result of long-standing ambitions of the German power elite.

Fischer thesis 

In the 1950s, Fischer examined the Imperial German government archives – such as were extant and available at the time – that related to the Great War. (This had previously been done by Karl Kautsky, Professor Walther Schucking and Count Max Montgelas and published at Charlottenburg in November 1919 in a collection known as The Kautsky Documents. In 1924 this large book was published in English. A further book by Count Montgelas, The Case for the Central Powers was published in London the following year.)

The American Klaus Epstein noted, when Fischer published his findings in 1961, that in his opinion Fischer instantly rendered obsolete every book previously published on the subject of responsibility for the First World War, and German aims in that war. Fischer's own position on German responsibility for World War I has become known as the "Fischer thesis."

In 1961, Fischer, who by then had risen to the rank of full professor at the University of Hamburg, rocked the history profession with his first postwar book, Griff nach der Weltmacht: Die Kriegszielpolitik des kaiserlichen Deutschland 1914–1918 (published in English as Germany's Aims in the First World War), in which he argued that Germany had deliberately instigated World War I in an attempt to become a world power. In this book, which was primarily concerned with the role played in the formation of German foreign policy by domestic pressure groups, Fischer argued that various pressure groups in German society had ambitions for aggressive imperialist policy in Eastern Europe, Africa and the Middle East. In Fischer's opinion, the "September Program" of September 1914 calling for the annexation of parts of Europe and Africa was an attempt at compromise between the demands of the lobbying groups in German society for wide-ranging territorial expansion. Though Fischer argued that the German government did not want a war with the British Empire, they were ready to run the risk in pursuit of annexation and hegemony.

The book was preceded by Fischer's groundbreaking 1959 article in the Historische Zeitschrift in which he first published the arguments that he expanded upon in his 1961 book.  In The Shield of Achilles: War, Peace, and the Course of History, Philip Bobbitt has written that after Fischer published it became "impossible to maintain" that World War I had been a "ghastly mistake" rather than the consequence of German policy.

For most Germans, it was acceptable to believe that Germany had caused World War II, but not World War I, which was still widely regarded as a war forced upon Germany by its encircling enemies. Fischer was the first German historian to publish documents showing that the German chancellor Dr. Theobald von Bethmann Hollweg had made plans in September 1914 (after the war began) to annex all of Belgium, part of France and part of Russia. Fischer suggested that there was continuity in German foreign policy from 1900 to the Second World War, implying that Germany was responsible for both world wars. These ideas were expanded in his later books Krieg der Illusionen (War of Illusions), Bündnis der Eliten (From Kaiserreich to Third Reich) and Hitler war kein Betriebsunfall (Hitler Was No Chance Accident). Though Fischer was an expert on the Imperial era, his work was important in the debate about the foreign policy of the Third Reich.

In his 1969 book War of Illusions (Krieg der Illusionen), Fischer offered a detailed study of German politics from 1911 to 1914 in which he offered a Primat der Innenpolitik (primacy of domestic politics) analysis of German foreign policy. In Fischer's view, the Imperial German state saw itself under siege by rising demands for democracy at home and looked to distract democratic strivings through a policy of aggression abroad.

In Fischer's view, while 19th-century German society moved forwards economically and industrially, it did not do so politically. For Fischer, German foreign policy before 1914 was largely motivated by the efforts of the reactionary German elite to distract the public from casting their votes for the Social Democrats and to make Germany the world's greatest power at the expense of France, Britain and Russia. The German elite that caused World War I was also responsible for the failure of the Weimar Republic, which opened the way for the Third Reich. This traditional German elite, in Fischer's analysis, was dominated by a racist, imperialist and capitalist ideology that was little different from the beliefs of the Nazis. For this reason, Fischer called Bethmann Hollweg the "Hitler of 1914." Fischer's claims set off the so-called "Fischer Controversy" of the early 1960s when German historians led by Gerhard Ritter attempted to rebut Fischer. The Australian historian John Moses noted in 1999 that the documentary evidence introduced by Fischer is extremely persuasive in arguing that Germany was responsible for World War I. In 1990, The Economist advised its readers to examine Fischer's "well documented" book to examine why people in Eastern Europe feared the prospect of German reunification.

Fischer with his analytical model caused a revolution in German historiography. Fischer's Primat der Innenpolitik heuristic, with its examination of the "inputs" into German foreign policy by domestic pressure groups and their interaction with the imperialist ideas of the German elite, forced a re-evaluation of German foreign policy in the Imperial era. Fischer's discovery of Imperial German government documents advocating as a war aim the ethnic cleansing of Russian Poland and subsequent German colonization, to provide Germany with Lebensraum (living space) led many to argue that similar schemes pursued by the Nazis in World War II were not due solely to Adolf Hitler's ideas but rather reflected widely held German aspirations that long pre-dated Hitler.

Criticisms 
Fischer's allegations caused a deep controversy throughout the academic world, particularly in West Germany. His arguments caused so much anger that his publisher's office in Hamburg was firebombed. His works inspired other historians, such as Gerhard Ritter, to write books and articles against his war-aims thesis.

Many critics claim that Fischer placed Germany outside the proper historical context. They argue that Germany was not uniquely aggressive amongst European nations of the early 20th century, a time when Social Darwinist views of struggle were popular in Europe's ruling classes. Critics also contend that in the centuries following Columbus's voyages to America, the Western European countries including Britain, France, Spain, Portugal, the Netherlands, etc. had already acquired vast overseas colonial possessions and spheres of influence long before German unification in 1871, so it is difficult to single out Germany alone as "grasping for world power" when this was a centuries-old Western European tradition. It was not until after World War II that many European colonial subjects finally won their independence. Even after the conclusion of the Second World War, France refused to relinquish control over Indochina.

Moreover, Fischer's timetable has also been criticized as inaccurate. Bethmann Hollweg's Septemberprogramm, outlining German war aims, was not produced until after the war had begun and was still going well for Germany. At the same time, other powers had been harboring similarly grandiose plans for post-war territorial gains. Since its defeat in the Franco-Prussian War in 1870, France was committed to a path of revenge against Germany and the reacquisition of Alsace and Lorraine. Russia, too, had long-standing, explicit war aims.

Bibliography 
 Moritz August von Bethmann-Hollweg und der Protestantismus, 1938.
 Ludwig Nikolvius: Rokoko, Reform, Restoration, 1942.
 Griff nach der Weltmacht: die Kriegszielpolitik des Kaiserlichen Deutschland, 1914–18, 1961.
 Germany's Aims in the First World War, translated by Hajo Holborn and James Joll (1968)
 Weltmacht oder Niedergang: Deutschland im Ersten Weltkrieg, 1965
  World Power or Decline: The Controversy over Germany's Aims in the First World War, 1974
 Krieg der Illusionen: Die deutsche Politik von 1911 bis 1914, 1969.
 War of Illusions: German Policies from 1911 to 1914, translated by Marian Jackson and Alan Bullock (1975)
 Bündnis der Eliten: Zur Kontinuität der Machstrukturen in Deutschland, 1871–1945, 1979.
 From Kaiserreich to the Third Reich: Elements of Continuity in German History, 1871–1945, translated by Roger Fletcher (1986)
 Hitler war kein Betriebsunfall: Aufsätze, 1992.

See also 
 Causes of World War I
 Historiography of the Causes of World War I
 Karl Max, Fürst Lichnowsky

Notes

References 
 Carsten, F.L Review of Griff nach der Weltmacht in English Historical Review, Volume 78, Issue #309, October 1963, pp 751–753
 Epstein, Klaus Review: German War Aims in the First World War in World Politics, Volume 15, Issue # 1, October 1962 pages 163-185
 Fletcher, Roger, Introduction to Fritz Fischer, From Kaiserreich to Third Reich, London: Allen & Unwin, 1986.
 Geiss, Imanuel, Studien über Geschichte und Geschichtswissenschaft, 1972.
 Geiss, Imanuel & Wendt, Bernd Jürgen (editors) Deutschland in der Weltpolitik des 19. und 20. Jahrhunderts: Fritz Fischer zum 65. Geburtstag (Germany in the World Politics of the 19th and 20th centuries: Fritz Fischer on His 65th Birthday), Düsseldorf: Bertelsmann Universitätsverlag, 1973.
 
 Moses, John The war aims of imperial Germany: Professor Fritz Fischer and his critics (1968) online
 Moses, John The Politics of Illusion: The Fischer Controversy in German Historiography, London: Prior, 1975.
  
  
 Spraul, Gunter Leopold "Der Fischer-Komplex", Halle: Projekte-Verlag Cornelius, 2012, .
 Taylor, A.J.P. "Fritz Fischer and his school." Journal of Modern History 47.1 (1975): 120–124. online

External links 
 Volker Berghahn, "Fritz Fischer, 1908–1999" in: AHA Perspectives (March 2000).

1908 births
1999 deaths
German military personnel of World War II
Historians of Nazism
People from the Kingdom of Bavaria
Humboldt University of Berlin alumni
University of Erlangen-Nuremberg alumni
Academic staff of the University of Hamburg
20th-century German historians
German male non-fiction writers
20th-century Freikorps personnel
Officers Crosses of the Order of Merit of the Federal Republic of Germany
Nazi Party members
Sturmabteilung personnel
Corresponding Fellows of the British Academy